Lionel Murphy (15 September 1895–1968) was an English footballer who played in the Football League for Bolton Wanderers, Derby County and Norwich City.

References

1895 births
1968 deaths
English footballers
Association football forwards
English Football League players
Derby County F.C. players
Bolton Wanderers F.C. players
Mansfield Town F.C. players
Norwich City F.C. players
Luton Town F.C. players